Movitz! Movitz! is album by Cornelis Vreeswijk from 1977. It is another album of Vreeswijk´s
interpretations of the Stockholm troubadour, Carl Michael Bellman.

Track list
Songs and lyrics from Fredman's Epistles and Fredman's Songs by Carl Michael Bellman.

 Epistel no. 52 – Movitz, mitt hjärta blöder! - 3:16
 Epistel no. 56 – Nota bene - 1:12
 Epistel no. 65 – Movitz med flor om armen - 4:55
 Epistel no. 28 – Tre remmare - 2:55
 Epistel no.  2 – Nå, skruva fiolen - 2:18
 Epistel no. 81 – Märk hur vår skugga - 4:37
 Epistel no. 80 – Liksom en herdinna - 3:38
 Epistel no. 35 – Bröderna fara väl vilse ibland - 3:03
 Epistel no. 17 – Bacchi kalender - 0:50
 Song no. 18 – Frossan - 2:43
 Epistel no. 34 – Ack, för en usel koja! - 2:55
 Epistel no. 30 – Drick ur ditt glas - 6:32

Personnel
Cornelis Vreeswijk – vocals
 Ulf G. Åhslund – acoustic guitar, arrangements

References

Cornelis Vreeswijk albums
1977 albums
Carl Michael Bellman